DTDP-3-amino-3,6-dideoxy-alpha-D-galactopyranose N,N-dimethyltransferase (RavNMT) is an enzyme with systematic name S-adenosyl-L-methionine:dTDP-3-amino-3,6-dideoxy-alpha-D-galactopyranose 3-N,N-dimethyltransferase. This enzyme catalyses the following chemical reaction

 2 S-adenosyl-L-methionine + dTDP-3-amino-3,6-dideoxy-alpha-D-galactopyranose  2 S-adenosyl-L-homocysteine + dTDP-3-dimethylamino-3,6-dideoxy-alpha-D-galactopyranose

The enzyme is involved in the synthesis of dTDP-D-ravidosamine.

References

External links 
 

EC 2.1.1